The women's artistic individual all-around competition at the 1960 Summer Olympics was held at the Baths of Caracalla from 6 to 8 September. It was the third appearance of the event.

Competition format

The gymnastics format continued to use the aggregation format. Each nation entered either a team of six gymnasts or up to three individual gymnasts. All entrants in the gymnastics competitions performed both a compulsory exercise and a voluntary exercise for each apparatus. The 8 exercise scores were summed to give an individual all-around total. Separate apparatus finals were held, with the top 6 in each apparatus advancing to the final.

Exercise scores ranged from 0 to 10, apparatus scores from 0 to 20, and individual totals from 0 to 80.

Results

References

Women's artistic individual all-around
1960
Women's events at the 1960 Summer Olympics